Ivanhoe is an unincorporated community in Fannin County, Texas, United States.

The Sam Rayburn Independent School District serves area students.

Ivanhoe General Store is located in Ivanhoe, which also has a post office and a winery. Every October since 2011 Ivanhoe has put on a wine show.

References

Unincorporated communities in Fannin County, Texas
Unincorporated communities in Texas